Oberea erythrostoma is a species of beetle in the family Cerambycidae. It was described by Heller in 1915. It is known from the Philippines.

Varietas
 Oberea erythrostoma var. makilingi Heller, 1915
 Oberea erythrostoma var. albocuspis Heller, 1915
 Oberea erythrostoma var. schadenbergi Heller, 1915

References

erythrostoma
Beetles described in 1915